Edward Nelson Bernet (born October 24, 1933) is a former American football wide receiver and a country singer. He played college football at Southern Methodist University, and played professionally for the National Football League's Pittsburgh Steelers in 1955, then returned to his hometown in 1960 to play for the American Football League's Dallas Texans. After retire, he formed country group The Levee Singers. He performed Truck driving country and road music.

See also
 List of American Football League players
 Country music

References

1933 births
Living people
Players of American football from Dallas
American football tight ends
SMU Mustangs football players
Pittsburgh Steelers players
Dallas Texans (AFL) players